Western is a Franco-Belgian one shot comic written by Jean Van Hamme, illustrated by Grzegorz Rosinski and published by Le Lombard in French and Cinebook in English.

Story

In this comic, Ambrosius Van Deer comes to Fort Laramie to meet Jess Chisum, a young man who claims he's found Van Deer's nephew Eddie. Ten years before, Edwyn Van Deer had disappeared after his family was killed in a Lakota raid. The proof of his identity is a silver watch with a picture of his parents. However, fate has other plans than a happy family reunion, and the events of that day set in motion a tragedy 15 years in the making.

Volume
Western - May 2001

Translations

Cinebook Ltd plans to publish Western in June 2011

References

Bandes dessinées